DnaJ homolog subfamily B member 6 is a protein that in humans is encoded by the DNAJB6 gene.

Function 

This gene encodes a member of the DNAJ protein family. DNAJ family members are characterized by a highly conserved amino acid stretch called the 'J-domain' and function as one of the two major classes of molecular chaperones involved in a wide range of cellular events, such as protein folding and oligomeric protein complex assembly. This family member may also play a role in polyglutamine aggregation in specific neurons. Alternative splicing of this gene results in multiple transcript variants; however, not all variants have been fully described.

Interactions 

DNAJB6 has been shown to interact with keratin 18. It has been also shown that the aggregation of Aβ42 (a process involved in e.g. Alzheimer's disease) is retarded by DNAJB6 in a concentration-dependent manner, extending to very low sub-stoichiometric molar ratios of chaperone to peptide. Dominant mutations in DNAJB6 have also been found to cause a late-onset muscle disease termed limb-girdle muscular dystrophy type D1 (LGMDD1), which is characterized by protein aggregation and vacuolar myopathology.

References

Further reading

External links 
 
 

Heat shock proteins
Co-chaperones